Ganggyeong-class minehunter is a ship class of minehunters currently in service on the Republic of Korea Navy.

Because of the improvements in naval mine technology in the 1980s, and the lack of minesweeping ability, the Korean Navy designed their first minehunter ship in 1983 and launched the first minehunter, in 1986. Currently, there are six Ganggyeong-class minehunter operating in the Korean Navy.

History
At the Korean War, Korea did not have proper minesweeping equipment, and it was all about pulling naval mines out of fishing nets or blowing up floating mines with light machine guns. Therefore, North Korea inflicted massive damage by the naval mine. From the 1950s, Korea purchased and used American minehunting vehicles, called Geumhwa, Geumsan, Namyang classes.

In the 1980s, according to the research report on the Navy, the Korean Navy's ability to minesweep was very weak compared to North Korea. There were very few short-range ships, and the ships in operation were seriously degraded due to deterioration. The Korean Navy felt an urgent need to modify existing coastal submarines or to introduce new ships.

The Korean Navy began ship design in 1983, and finished its first minehunter project in 1986, with the launch of the first ship . Later, five more ships were launched and commissioned.

The Yangyang class has improved minesweeping ability compared to the Ganggyeong class.

Design
They are equipped with a  main gun, small depth charges, about 300 naval mines, and Mine Disposal Vehicle (MDV). They use two Voith Schneider Propellers as propulsion, to control the ship more precisely.

Officially about 50 crew are board the ship, but some source suggests that it is 40.

Hull material
To protect the ship from magnetic mine, the ship's hull is made of fibre-reinforced plastic, which does not have a magnetic attraction. It also minimized metallic equipment to tightly control the magnetic material inside the ship. Steel objects that are brought into the ship, like canned food, are heavily restricted and strictly controlled.

Naming
The naming of minehunter ships is taken from the names of counties and towns adjacent to a naval base. For example, Ganggyeong is the name of Ganggyeong-Eup in Nonsan, South Chungcheong, and Gangjin is taken from Gangjin County, South Jeolla.

List of ships

See also
 Wonsan-class minelayer
 Yangyang-class minesweeper
 Nampo-class minelayer

References

Mine warfare vessels of the Republic of Korea Navy
Mine warfare vessel classes